Zollingeria is a genus of plants in the family Sapindaceae.

Species include:

 Zollingeria borneensis Adema
 Zollingeria dongnaiensis Pierre

References

 
Sapindaceae genera
Taxonomy articles created by Polbot